Lemontree is a rural locality in the Toowoomba Region, Queensland, Australia.

Geography
The northeastern boundary is aligned with the Condamine River.  The main occupation is raising sheep, beef cattle and fodder.

Road infrastructure
Millmerran–Cecil Plains Road runs along the western boundary.

History
The name Lemontree comes from a pastoral run in the district, whose name in turn came from the Lemon Tree Lagoon, a place where lemons grew.

Lemontree was part of the original vast Yandilla station established by the Gore brothers, St. George Richard Gore and Ralph Thomas Gore, in 1841.  It was opened for settlement under the Crown Lands Alienation Act of 1876 when the Gore lease expired in 1887.

In 1879, it was organized into part of the Jondaryan Division which became a shire in 1903. In 1913, along with other lands in and around the town of Millmerran, it became part of the Shire of Millmerran. In 2008 the area was incorporated into the new Toowoomba Region.

References

External links
 
 

Localities in Queensland
Darling Downs
Toowoomba Region